Mongolian Braille is the braille alphabet used for the Mongolian language in Mongolia.  It is based on Russian Braille, with two additional letters for print letters found in the Mongolian Cyrillic alphabet.

Alphabet 
The printed Mongolian Cyrillic alphabet has all the letters of printed Russian, though some are only used in loan words, plus the letters ө, ү.  

The non-Russian letters ө, ү, have the forms of two obsolete letters of Russian Braille.  The Mongolian vowel ө (ö) is coincidentally similar in print to the old Russian consonant ѳ (th), and it takes the latter's braille assignment, ; the Mongolian vowel ү (ü) takes the assignment of the old Russian vowel yat, .

Punctuation

See also 
Mongolian Cyrillic alphabet, for the braille alphabet aligned with Cyrillic

References

French-ordered braille alphabets
Mongolian language